The Three Musketeers (aka Three Musketeers) is a 1933 American pre-Code film serial directed by Armand Schaeffer and Colbert Clark, and produced by Nat Levine for Mascot Pictures.  The film serial was very loosely based on Alexandre Dumas' 1844 novel The Three Musketeers, with the musketeers changed into three soldiers in the French Foreign Legion, and d'Artagnan being reconfigured as Lt. Tom Wayne (played by John Wayne), a pilot in the United States military.

Wayne only received fourth billing behind Raymond Hatton, Francis X. Bushman, Jr. and Jack Mulhall who play the three legionnaires. Lon Chaney Jr. had a co-starring role in the serial, mainly appearing in Chapter One.

Plot
In the harsh deserts of North Africa, the French Foreign Legion provides a military presence.  Lt. Tom Wayne is framed for the murder of Armand Corday, the brother of his fiancé. He vows to capture the real killer, a mysterious Arab terrorist known only as El Shaitan. He encounters three bumptious legionnaires:  Clancy, an Irishman always spoiling for a fight; Renard, a wily Frenchman; and Schmidt, a German who loves sausages). They are the surviving members of a Foreign Legion unit that was wiped out in an attack.

Nicknamed the "Devil of the Desert", El Shaitan remains a shadowy figure, hiding his face and his true identity, as a result of which many people are mistakenly suspected of being the cult leader in the course of the serial, while other characters impersonate him for their own ends. At a meeting place called, "The Devil's Circle", El Shaitan commands a fanatic desert cult, a secret society formed to fight against the French authorities.

When Clancy, Renard and Schmidt are trapped by a horde of Berber tribesmen, Lt. Wayne quickly stops the attack using the machine gun mounted on his aircraft. The three legionnaires are in constant danger but Wayne comes to their rescue many times, acting as a modern-day d'Artagnan. Eventually the trio, with the aid of their new friend, triumph over their adversaries.

Cast

 John Wayne as Tom Wayne
 Ruth Hall as Elaine Corday
 Jack Mulhall as Clancy
 Raymond Hatton as Renard
 Francis X. Bushman, Jr. (Ralph Bushman)  as Schmidt
 Noah Beery, Jr. as Stubbs
 Al Ferguson as Ali, chief henchman
 Hooper Atchley as El Kadur
 George Magrill as El Maghreb
 Edward Peil, Sr. as Ratkin
 Gordon de Main as Colonel Duval
 William Desmond as Captain Boncour
 Robert Warwick as Colonel Brent
 Creighton Chaney (Lon Chaney, Jr.; credited as  Armand Corday)
 Robert Frazer as Major Booth.

Reception
Like many other serials, The Three Musketeers was re-edited into a feature film version when it was re-released. In 1946, Favorite Films Corporation edited the serial into a 60-minute feature film called Desert Command. The chapter screen titles were eliminated to create a more continuous flow.

Chapters

 The Fiery Circle
 One for All and All for One
 The Master Spy
 Pirates of the Desert
 Rebel Rifles
 Death's Marathon
 Naked Steel
 The Master Strikes
 The Fatal Cave
 Trapped
 The Measure of a Man
 The Glory of Comrades
Source:

John Wayne
During the 1930s, after starring in The Big Trail (1930), its subsequent commercial failure meant that Wayne was relegated to minor roles in A-pictures, or starring, with his name over the title, in many low-budget Poverty Row Westerns, mostly at Monogram Pictures and serials for Mascot Pictures Corporation. Wayne would star in two other Mascot serials: The Shadow of the Eagle (1932) and The Hurricane Express (1932).

See also
 John Wayne filmography
 List of American films of 1932
 List of film serials
 List of film serials by studio
 List of films in the public domain in the United States

References

Notes

Citations

Bibliography

 Cline, William C. "9. They Who Also Serve (The Citizens)"; "Filmography", In the Nick of Time. Jefferson, North Carolina: McFarland & Company, Inc., 1984, .
 Clooney, Nick. The Movies That Changed Us: Reflections on the Screen. New York: Atria Books, 2002. .
 Harmon, Jim and Donald F. Glut. The Great Movie Serials: Their Sound and Fury. Garden City, New York: Doubleday, 1972. .
 Rainey, Buck. Serials and Series: A World Filmography, 1912–1956. Jefferson, North Carolina: McFarland & Company, Inc., 2010. . 
 Shaheen, Jack G. Reel Bad Arabs: How Hollywood Vilifies a People. New York: Olive Branch Press, 2001. .
 Weiss, Ken and Ed Goodgold. To be Continued ...: A Complete Guide to Motion Picture Serials. New York: Bonanza Books, 1973. .

External links

Download or view online
 
 Episode 1 on Google Video

1933 films
1933 adventure films
American aviation films
American black-and-white films
1930s English-language films
Films based on The Three Musketeers
Films directed by Armand Schaefer
Mascot Pictures film serials
Films set in Africa
Films about the French Foreign Legion
Films produced by Nat Levine
American adventure films
1930s American films